New Baden may refer to:

Places
 New Baden, Illinois, United States
 New Baden, Texas, United States